I Don't Want to Go to Bed is the second album by American instrumental rock band Cul de Sac, released in 1995 through Thirsty Ear Recordings.

Critical reception
The Rough Guide to Rock described the tracks as "raw, lengthy rehearsal pieces that recall Can's studio jams in intensity and invention."

Track listing

Personnel 
Cul de Sac
Robin Amos – synthesizers, kalimba, production
Chris Fujiwara – bass guitar
Chris Guttmacher – drums, percussion, guitar
Glenn Jones – guitar, keyboards
Production and additional personnel
David Greenburger – design
Bill Salkin – production, engineering

References

External links 
 

1995 albums
Cul de Sac (band) albums
Thirsty Ear Recordings albums